Okkade is a 2005 Indian Telugu-language film directed by Chandra Mahesh and starring Srihari and Santhoshi.

Cast
 Srihari as SP Yugandhar
 Santhoshi as Kanaka Durga
 Mukesh Rishi as Subbarayudu
 Jeeva as Chowdappa
 L. B. Sriram
 Bharath Teja as Chinnappa
 Sivaji Raja as Sivaji
 Jaya Prakash Reddy as Subbarayudu's elder brother
 Dharmavarapu Subramanyam
 Nagendra Babu as Home Minister
 Prudhviraj as Police Officer
 Telangana Shakuntala
 Surekha Vani as Sivaji's wife
 Sarika Ramachandra Rao as Lawyer
 Rajitha

References

2000s Telugu-language films
Indian action films
2000s masala films
Fictional portrayals of the Andhra Pradesh Police
Films scored by Vandemataram Srinivas
2005 action films
2005 films